Global Underground 010: Danny Tenaglia, Athens is a DJ mix album in the Global Underground series, compiled and mixed by Danny Tenaglia. The mix is a retrospective look at a set in Athens, Greece.

Tenaglia’s Athens mix is another seminal moment in GU history. Securing him was a major coup for the brand, which up to this point had been exclusively the preserve of British DJs. Danny’s tripped out tribalism was the hottest sound in clubland. During Miami’s annual Winter Music Conference his all-day sets were at their most influential period.  DJs from around the world rushed home to infuse their own residencies with dark, twisted drum-fuelled tracks, but Tenaglia remained the undisputed master of the genre.

This mix brought his New York after-hour vibes to a huge new audience. It raised his wider profile beyond simply the gushing praise of the DJs and journalists lucky enough to travel to the States to hear him, and saw him in great demand for international guest slots and a string of amazing UK festival appearances.

Danny’s distinctive tribal house was a new direction but a perfect fit. Just the right intense slice of dance floor alchemy that GU mixes had become famous for. The influence of his sound continued to be heard in clubs everywhere for years, but GU010 marked the time it first ripped across many thousands of bedrooms and personal stereos and raised the game for those clubbers forever.

Track listing

Disc one 
 Stereo Dancer - "Absolute Reason" – 7:18
 Lapis Lazuli EP - Primitive 3" – 3:11
 BPT - "Moody" – 6:51
 Danny Tenaglia featuring Liz Torres - "Turn Me On (John Ciafone's Dub)" – 6:35
 2 Right Wrongans - "System Error" – 5:45
 Dahlback & Krome - "The Real Jazz (Dahlback Mix)" – 5:00
 Deep - "Dom Dom Jump" – 5:52
 Lords of Svek - "Debajo" – 4:30
 Scumfrog - "The Water Song" – 5:23
 Icarus - "'Round Midnight" – 4:02
 EBE - "Deimos" – 4:24
 Miss Kittin - "Frank Sinatra" – 3:39
 Anthony Rother - "Red Light District" – 7:31

Disc two 
 Tilt - "Seduction of Orpheus" – 7:49
 M.I.K.E. - "Deepest Jungle" – 6:09
 Robbie Rivera - "Feel This" – 5:23
 Cari Lekebusch - "Stealin Music" – 4:45
 Saint Etienne - "Cool Kids of Death" – 9:41
 Mac Zimms - "Batido" – 5:23
 Danny Tenaglia & Celeda - "Music Is the Answer" – 8:20
 Return of the Native - "The After" – 6:00
 Barbarus - "Phonic Call" – 4:37
 Yves Deruyter - "Feel Free" – 7:28
 Stuff It - "Release the Pressure" – 6:22

References

External links 

Danny Tenaglia albums
Global Underground
1999 compilation albums
DJ mix albums